The Drainie-Taylor Biography Prize was a Canadian literary award, presented by the Writers' Trust of Canada to a work judged as the year's best work of biography, autobiography or personal memoir by a Canadian writer.

Created in 1998, the award was named in honour of Nathan A. Taylor, one of the country's leading entertainment impresarios, and actor John Drainie. Writer and actor Claire Drainie Taylor, the award's benefactor, was married to Drainie from 1942 until his death in 1966, and was subsequently married to Taylor until his death in 2004.

The first award was presented in November 1999. For the remainder of the award's existence, however, the award was presented in the spring of the year following the year in which the eligible works were published. The final award was presented in March 2006 to honor works published in 2005.

The award was discontinued after 2006, in favour of an expanded prize package for the Writers' Trust Prize for Nonfiction.

Nominees and winners

References

Awards established in 1999
1999 establishments in Canada
Biography awards
Writers' Trust of Canada awards
Canadian non-fiction literary awards
2006 disestablishments in Canada
Awards disestablished in 2006